"Phantoms Can't Hang" is a song by Canadian electronic music producer Deadmau5, released as the fourth and final single from his seventh studio album While(1<2) on June 10, 2014.

Background and release
This song was originally combined with another song by him ("Avaritia") and uploaded to his SoundCloud account, prior to its deletion, where it was titled 'Where Phantoms Sleep 04' before the two were separated into individual tracks. 

The song premiered through SoundCloud the day before its release on June 9, 2014, before officially releasing on June 10, 2014.

Track listing

Charts

References

2014 singles
2014 songs
Deadmau5 songs
Songs written by Deadmau5